Grevillea hockingsii is a species of flowering plant in the family Proteaceae and is endemic to south-eastern Queensland. It is an erect shrub with oblong to narrowly elliptic leaves and clusters of reddish-pink flowers.

Description
The lower surface of the leaves is silky-hairy.

Taxonomy
Grevillea hockingsii was first formally described in 2008 by Bill Molyneux and Peter M. Olde in the journal Telopea from specimens collected in the Coominglah State Forest, Queensland in 1989. The specific epithet (hockingsii) honours Francis David Hockings who discovered the species in 1983.

Distribution and habitat
This grevillea grows in the shrubby understorey of woodland or open forest in a three disjunct areas in south-eastern Queensland.

Conservation status
Grevillea hockingsii is listed as "vulnerable" under the Queensland Government Nature Conservation Act 1992.

See also
 List of Grevillea species

References

hockingsii
Flora of Queensland
Proteales of Australia
Plants described in 1994